Horky is the name of several locations in the Czech Republic:

 Horky (Kutná Hora District), a village in the Central Bohemian Region
 Horky (Svitavy District), a village in the Pardubice Region

See also:
 Hôrky, a village in Slovakia